Mattinson may refer to:

Burny Mattinson (born 1935), American storyboarder for Walt Disney Animation Studios
Campbell Mattinson (born 1968), Australian editor, writer and critic
Gerald Mattinson (born 1958), American basketball coach
Miles Walker Mattinson KC (1854–1944), English barrister, Conservative MP
William Mattinson (1836–1911), politician in South Australia

See also
Mattison